The Superions is the first EP by comedy synthpop band The Superions, a side project of Fred Schneider of The B-52s. The EP was released on January 19, 2010 as a digital download in the United States.  On February 23, 2010, the EP was released on CD and Limited Edition 12" in the US by Happy Happy Birthday To Me Records.

The Superions features remastered versions of the group's first two digital singles, "Totally Nude Island" and "Totally Nude Island (Ursula 1000 Remix)" and two new remixes of "Totally Nude Island" by The Lolligags and Marshmallow Coast (featuring Andy Gonzales, former member of Of Montreal).  The EP also includes the single "Who Threw That Ham At Me" and "Who Threw That Ham At Me (Casper & The Cookies Remix)" (featuring Jason NeSmith, also a former member of Of Montreal). A digital "Bonus Track Version" was released on March 1, 2011 and included the track "Those Sexy Saucer Gals (WeHaveLove Remix)".

Track listing

Formats

 CD US Edition - containing the 7-track EP.
 12" US Limited Edition - containing the 7-track EP, first pressing of 300 on clear/smoke vinyl, 200 black vinyl, silkscreened sleeve with mp3 download code.
 Digital "Bonus Track Version" - containing the 7-track EP plus the bonus track "Those Sexy Saucer Gals (WeHaveLove Remix)"

Personnel 
Band
 Fred Schneider - vocals
 Noah Brodie - keyboards
 Dan Marshall - programming

Additional musicians
 Ryan Breegle - *additional remix and production
 Leslie Dallion - *additional vocals
 Jason NeSmith - **additional remix and production
 Ursula 1000 - ***additional remix and production
 Andy From Denver with Trimmer-Tronic - ****additional remix and production

Production
 Producer: The Superions
 Mastering: Bob Katz at Digital Domain
 Additional Mixing: Wally Walton at Greg Rike Productions
 Additional Mixing: +Robin Reumers at Digital Domain
 Management: Dave Brodie
 Artwork: Mike Turner (credited as Sleeve McQueen on the CD)

References

External links
 The Superions (Bonus Track Version) on iTunes

2010 EPs